At present, there are four multi-lateral free trade areas in Europe, and one former free trade area in recent history. Note that there are also a number of bilateral free trade agreements between states and between trade blocks; and that some states participate in more than one free trade area.

EU

The European Union (EU) has always operated as more than a free trade area with its predecessor, the European Economic Community (EEC) being founded as a customs union. The EU has free trade agreements to varying levels with most other European countries.

EU Single Market
The EU shares its single market with three EFTA members via the European Economic Area agreement, and the remaining EFTA member—Switzerland—via bilateral agreements.

EU Customs Union
The European Union Customs Union is a customs union which consists of all the member states of the European Union and Turkey, San Marino, Monaco, Andorra and the UK territory of Akrotiri and Dhekelia which are outside of the EU. In addition to allowing for free trade between states, the customs union imposes a common external tariff on all goods entering the area.

EFTA

The European Free Trade Association (EFTA) was created in 1960 by the outer seven (as a looser alternative to the then-European Communities) but most of its membership has since joined the Communities/EU leaving only four countries (Iceland, Norway, Switzerland and Liechtenstein) still party to the treaty. The United Kingdom is the only former EFTA member which is not currently part of the EU, following its withdrawal in 2020.

CEFTA

Following the fall of the Iron Curtain, two free trade areas were created in Central Europe, the Baltic Free Trade Area (BAFTA) and the Central European Free Trade Agreement (CEFTA), in order to stabilise these countries for membership of the EU. With the 2004 EU enlargement, the original members of both of these have left these agreements and joined the EU.

CEFTA has expanded into southern Europe with members from the Western Balkans and Moldova. All of the new CEFTA countries, except for Moldova, are prospective members of the EU and hence EFTA is the only free trade area with a long-term future, as there are no immediate plans for these countries to change their present status. However, CEFTA may gain new members in the form of countries neighbouring the present EU.

CISFTA

The Commonwealth of Independent States had been negotiating a CIS free trade area since 1994 and in 2011 eight countries agreed to create a free trade area. These are; Russia, Ukraine, Belarus, Kazakhstan, Kyrgyzstan, Tajikistan, Armenia and Moldova. In addition, Belarus, Kazakhstan, Russia, Armenia, and Kyrgyzstan form the Eurasian Economic Union, including a customs union and a single market.

GUAM

The GUAM Organization for Democracy and Economic Development is a regional organization and free-trade area in Eastern Europe composed of Georgia, Azerbaijan, Ukraine, and Moldova.

Historical

BAFTA

The Baltic Free Trade Area was a free trade agreement between Estonia, Latvia and Lithuania that existed between 1994 and 2004.

BAFTA was created to help prepare the countries for their accession to the EU. Hence, BAFTA was created more as an initiative of the EU than out of a desire for Baltic states to trade between themselves: they were more interested in gaining access to the rest of the European markets.

BAFTA's agreement was signed by the three states on 13 September 1993 and came into force on 1 April 1994. On 1 January 1997 the agreement was extended to cover trade in agricultural produce. On 1 May 2004, all three states joined the European Union, and BAFTA ceased to exist.

BAFTA was part of general co-operation between the three countries under the Baltic Assembly—modelled on Nordic co-operation (see Nordic Council). As well as the free trade area, they formed a common visa area. Leaders continue to meet regularly, however the assembly now focuses on international issues, including economic development, and military co-operation due to the proximity of Russia.

See also

 List of free trade agreements
 List of bilateral free trade agreements
 European Union free trade agreements
 Inner Six/Outer Seven
 Eurasian Economic Union
 European integration

References 

Trade blocs
History of the European Union
Europe